Greatest Hits is a hits compilation released by British singer-songwriter Robbie Williams on 18 October 2004. The album includes two new songs, "Radio" and "Misunderstood", which were both released as singles. The album is his seventh overall released in the United Kingdom.

Greatest Hits was one of the fastest selling albums upon release in the UK, where it debuted at the number-one spot with first week sales of over 320,000 copies. Certain versions of the album feature a picture of Williams in a pose exposing his pubic hair on the cover, and in the booklet is the Latin phase "...si quid habet mammas vel rotas, res habebis difficiles aliquando", translating into "if it has tits or wheels, it makes life difficult." A special edition box set, containing all of Williams' singles, was released on the same day.

Singles
Although Williams admitted on his website to being "perplexed at the prospect" of a greatest hits album, saying, "I rarely, if at all, look back over my career", he took the opportunity to also reveal two new songs he had been working on with his new collaborator, Stephen Duffy. Both were released as singles. "Radio", the compilation's first single, was released in October 2004, debuting at number-one of the UK Singles Chart, becoming Williams' sixth number-one hit selling 41,732 copies. The song was also a number-one hit in Denmark and Portugal, and it hit the top ten around the world. The album's second single, the ballad "Misunderstood", was included on the soundtrack of the film Bridget Jones: The Edge of Reason, and hit the top ten around the world in December of that year.

Commercial performance
Debuting at number one, the album sold 320,000 copies in its first week, becoming the fastest selling greatest hits album ever released in the United Kingdom. The album hit the top spot in 18 countries: France, Italy, Portugal, Spain, the aforementioned United Kingdom, Argentina, Colombia, Germany, Australia, New Zealand, and Switzerland among others. The album became the best selling album of the year in the United Kingdom, becoming the 61st best selling album in UK music history, with sales of 2 million copies, being certified 8× Platinum by the BPI.

Greatest Hits also became the best selling album of the year in Europe being certified 5× Platinum for over 5 million copies sold worldwide. The album ended up selling slightly under 8.5 million copies becoming one of Williams' best selling albums ever. In Germany, the album debuted at number one and reached this position in total nine times non-consecutively, Williams' second album to do so, the other one being Swing When You're Winning. With 102 weeks on the German Albums Chart it's his second longest chart one, just behind Sing When You're Winning, with 106 weeks. By selling 900,000 copies and reaching 9× Gold, Greatest Hits is the 20th best-selling album of the decade 2000–2009 in Germany and his 5th album to reach a position in the top twenty of the best-selling album of the decade, the others being Swing When You're Winning (4th best-selling), Escapology (5th best-selling), Intensive Care (8th best-selling) and Live at Knebworth (19th best-selling).

Track listing

The Best So Far

The Best So Far is an updated version of Greatest Hits, released exclusively in Brazil to celebrate Robbie's Close Encounters tour. Even with Greatest Hits being released in Brazil, The Best So Far updates the track listing slightly, adding "Sin Sin Sin", "Advertising Space" and "Tripping", but removing earlier hits such as "Old Before I Die", "Lazy Days" and "She's the One".

Track listing
"Sin Sin Sin" – 4:09
"Advertising Space" – 4:37
"Feel" – 4:22
"Angels" – 4:25
"Sexed Up" – 4:20
"Millennium" – 4:08
"Come Undone" – 4:38
"Rock DJ" – 4:18
"Supreme" – 4:19
"Tripping" – 4:07
"No Regrets" – 5:11
"Radio" – 3:51
"Misunderstood" – 4:02
"Let Me Entertain You" – 4:21

Charts

Weekly charts

Year-end charts

Decade-end charts

Certifications

References

2004 greatest hits albums
2006 greatest hits albums
Som Livre compilation albums
Robbie Williams albums

es:The Best So Far